Pedro Alexandre Mendes Marques (born 31 March 1988), commonly known as Pedrito, is a Portuguese professional footballer who plays as a midfielder.

Football career
Born in Figueira da Foz, Coimbra District, Marques played youth football with three clubs, including Sporting Clube de Portugal from ages 11–15. He moved abroad in 2006, going on to spend his last as a junior with Real Madrid.

In Spain, Marques never competed in higher than Segunda División B, representing Real Madrid C and CD San Roque de Lepe. In the 2011–12 season, he did not feature for any team.

Marques returned to his country in the 2012 summer, signing with S.C. Farense in the third level. He changed sides and countries again in the following transfer window, going on to make his professional debut in the Angolan Girabola with C.R.D. Libolo and later playing with G.D. Interclube also in that nation.

On 31 March 2016, Marques agreed to a contract with Bulgarian club PFC Beroe Stara Zagora after a successful trial period.  He was released in December.

In January 2017, Marques joined Gil Vicente.

References

External links
 
 

1988 births
Living people
People from Figueira da Foz
Portuguese footballers
Association football midfielders
Segunda Divisão players
Associação Naval 1º de Maio players
S.C. Farense players
Segunda División B players
Tercera División players
Real Madrid C footballers
CD San Roque de Lepe footballers
C.R.D. Libolo players
G.D. Interclube players
First Professional Football League (Bulgaria) players
PFC Beroe Stara Zagora players
Gil Vicente F.C. players
Portuguese expatriate footballers
Expatriate footballers in Spain
Expatriate footballers in Angola
Expatriate footballers in Bulgaria
Portuguese expatriate sportspeople in Spain
Portuguese expatriate sportspeople in Bulgaria
Sportspeople from Coimbra District